Adamantina is a municipality in the state of São Paulo, Brazil. The population is 35,111 (2020 est.) in an area of 412.0 km².

2000 Census
Important places: FAI - Faculdades Adamantinenses Integradas, ETEC "Prof. Eudécio Luiz Vicente", EEPSG "Profª  Fleurides Cavallini Menechino", EEPSG "Helen Keller", EEPSG "Durvalino Grion", EEPG "Navarro de Andrade", ACE - Associação Empresarial e Comercial de Adamantina, Recinto Poli Esportivo de Adamantina, Parque dos Pioneiros.

Population 
Total resident : 33,497
Males: 16,321
Female: 17,176
Urban: 30,368 (90.66%)
Agricultural: 3,129 (9.34%)

Resident population of 10 years or more

Total:  28.808

Health 
Hospitals:  2

Infrastructure 
Bank agencies:  9
Industries:  67
Commercial Establishments:  279
Services:  161

References

External links
  https://web.archive.org/web/20051107085238/http://www.aquitemagito.com.br/sp/adamantina/ - guide of events of Adamantina.
  City government's website

 
Populated places established in 1948